Miaenia insularis is a species of beetle in the family Cerambycidae. It was described by Fisher in 1934.

References

Miaenia
Beetles described in 1934